Eupithecia riparia is a moth in the family Geometridae. It is found in Italy, Slovenia, Croatia, Albania and Greece.

The wingspan is 16–17 mm.

The larvae feed on Drypis spinosa.

References

Moths described in 1851
riparia
Moths of Europe